Birbhum Mahavidyalaya, established in 1979, is a government affiliated college at Suri in the Birbhum district of West Bengal. It is affiliated to University of Burdwan and teaches arts, science and commerce.

Departments

Science

Chemistry 
Physics 
Mathematics

Arts

Bengali
English
Sanskrit
History
Geography
Political Science
Philosophy
Economics 
Education
Sociology

Accreditation
The college is recognized by the University Grants Commission (UGC).

See also

References

External links
Birbhum Mahavidyalaya

Colleges affiliated to University of Burdwan
Educational institutions established in 1979
Universities and colleges in Birbhum district
1979 establishments in West Bengal